Bluestone 42 is a British sitcom about a British bomb disposal detachment in Afghanistan during Operation Herrick, first broadcast on 5 March 2013 on BBC Three. The third and final series began on 9 March 2015 and ended on 13 April 2015. In July 2015, writers Richard Hurst and James Cary confirmed the show would not return for a fourth series, citing BBC Three's impending move to online and the withdrawal of troops from Afghanistan as contributing towards the show having run its course.

While the show takes place in Helmand Province, the series was filmed in South Africa.

Synopsis
A mix of black comedy and action, Bluestone 42 focused on the camaraderie between soldiers, situational comedy, bureaucracy, conflicts of interests and relationships, and is contrasted with the deadly situations the soldiers are required to defuse. The show's name refers to the unit's call sign and is rendered verbally as "Bluestone Four-Two".

Cast and characters

Overview

Episodes

Series 1 (2013)

Christmas Special (2013)

Series 2 (2014)

Series 3 (2015)

Reception
Bluestone 42 has been met with positive reviews. In The Independent, James Rampton described the show as "The Hurt Locker meets Miranda" and said that it "strikes the right balance between edgy and entertaining". Rich Johnston of BleedingCool.com compared the show favourably to M*A*S*H. Corporal Daniel Whittingham, a British Army bomb disposal expert, said the series' black humour was "spot-on" and its action scenes "pretty accurate".

Distribution

DVD

Broadcasts
In December 2014 Series 1 was broadcast on the Australian ABC network, and online player ABC iView.

References

External links
 

2010s British black comedy television series
2013 British television series debuts
2015 British television series endings
BBC television comedy
BBC television sitcoms
English-language television shows
Military comedy television series
Television shows set in Afghanistan
Works about armies